Mombacho is a stratovolcano in Nicaragua, near the city of Granada. The Mombacho Volcano Nature Reserve is one of 78 protected areas of Nicaragua. Mombacho’s last eruption occurred in 1570. There is no historical knowledge of earlier eruptions.

The highest regions of the volcano are home to a cloud forest and dwarf forest, which contain flora and fauna  endemic purely to the volcano. An increasingly popular tourist attraction, the volcano has views of Lake Nicaragua and the city of Granada. The volcano also has two hiking trails, a moderate one that circles the main crater, and another, more difficult trail (El Puma), which must be led by a guide.  The more difficult trail is the only way to see some features such as the dwarf forest.  The trail is almost completely 45° inclines and declines for about two miles.

More than 700 different plants are registered around Mombacho, including many species of orchids.

Images of Mombacho

See also
List of volcanoes in Nicaragua

References 

Stratovolcanoes of Nicaragua
Mountains of Nicaragua
Protected areas of Nicaragua